The 1947 Dartmouth Indians football team represented Dartmouth College during the 1947 college football season.  In its fifth season under head coach Tuss McLaughry, the team compiled a 4–4–1 record and was outscored by a total of 127 to 102. The team played its home games at Memorial Field in Hanover, New Hampshire.

Schedule

References

Dartmouth
Dartmouth Big Green football seasons
Dartmouth Indians football